Polytylites is an extinct genus of ostracod (seed shrimp) belonging to the order Palaeocopida and family Amphissitidae. Specimens have been found in beds of Carboniferous to Permian age in North America and Asia.

Species 
P. ambitus Cooper 1941
P. concavus Croneis and Bristol
P. crassus Cooper 1941
P. directus Cooper 1941
P. diversus Cooper 1941
P. grovei Croneis and Gutke
P. kitanipponica Ishizaki 1964
P. oblongus Hoare and Mapes 2000
P. reticulatus Cooper 1941
P. similis Croneis and Gale
P. simplex Hou 1954
P. sublineatus Croneis and Thurman
P. tricollinus Jones and Kirkby
P. trilobus Croneis and Gale

References 

Paleozoic life
Ostracods
Prehistoric ostracod genera